Belon'i Tsiribihina (also referred to as Belo sur Tsiribihina) is a district of the Menabe region of Madagascar and borders the Miandrivazo region to the east, the Mahabo to the southeast, and the Morondava to the southwest.

Communes
The district is further divided into 14 communes:

 Ambiky
 Amboalimena
 Andimaky Manambolo
 Ankalalobe
 Ankiliroroka
 Ankirondro
 Antsoha
 Belinta
 Belon'i Tsiribihina
 Berevo
 Beroboka
 Masoarivo
 Tsaraotana
 Tsimafana

References 

Districts of Menabe